Maria Agasovna Guleghina (née Meytardjan; born 9 August 1959) is a Soviet-born operatic soprano singer, particularly associated with the Italian repertory.

Biography
Maria Guleghina was born in Odessa, Ukrainian SSR, to an Armenian father and a Ukrainian mother, where she studied voice at the Music Conservatory with Evgeny Nikolaevich Ivanov (under whose tutorship she remained even after graduation). Guleghina is a citizen of Luxembourg where she resides with her family.

Career
Guleghina made her stage debut in 1985 as Yolantha at the State Opera in Minsk (Belarus) shortly before leaving USSR to pursue an international career.

Her international debut came in 1987 as Amelia (opposite Luciano Pavarotti's Riccardo) in a production of Un ballo in maschera at La Scala. Leading roles in I due Foscari, Manon Lescaut, and Tosca followed, and soon she was engaged to perform in Vienna, Munich, Hamburg, London, and other major European opera houses. She made her debut at the Paris Opera in 1995, in the killer-role of Abigaille in Nabucco.

Her American debut took place at the Metropolitan Opera in January 1991, where she sang Maddalena in Andrea Chénier. She has also appeared at the San Francisco Opera and the Lyric Opera of Chicago, adding the lead soprano roles in works such as Ernani, Simon Boccanegra, Cavalleria rusticana, Fedora. She later added other demanding roles such as Odabella in Attila (opera) and Lady Macbeth in Macbeth (opera), to her ever-growing repertoire. She also debuted at Mariinsky Theatre in St. Petersburg, Russia in 1992 as Lisa in Tchaikovsky's The Queen of Spades.

Guleghina has also performed in Japan many times (twice as a part of La Scala's tours of Japan) and has a fan base there. She is considered by most as one of the leading dramatic sopranos of her generation. She is largely admired for her warm and rich voice, strong stage presence, and absolute dramatic commitment to her roles on the stage. She sang the opening aria (Aida) at the official opening of the new Oslo Opera House. Throughout November 2009, she starred as Turandot in the opera Turandot at the Met in New York. She represented Russia by singing during the closing ceremony of the 2010 Winter Olympics in Vancouver during the handover of the Olympic flag. Guleghina also opened the 2014 Paralympic Games in Sochi, singing "Cossack Lullaby" on top of an icebreaker that carried her though the stadium.

After a 10 year absence Gulegina returned to the Royal Opera House (Covent Garden) to perform Tosca (February, 2016). She also returned to Moscow’s Bolshoi Theatre as Eboli in Verdi’s epic Don Carlos.

In 2017, she appeared as Puccini's Turandot at the Metropolitan Opera and same year appeared in Verdi's Nabucco in a role of Abigaille.

In 2018, she made her Wagner debut as Kundry in Parsifal at the Mariinsky Theatre under Valery Gergiev. In 2019 she repeated the role in Sofia National Opera under Constantin Trinks' direction.

Guleghina performed in over 160 performances at the Metropolitan Opera in New York and has performed leading roles in 15 different opera productions at Teatro alla Scala where she also had two solo recitals.

Guleghina has received numerous prizes and awards.

Charitable work
She is a member of the Honorary Board of the International Paralympic Committee as well as a UNICEF Goodwill Ambassador. She sang during the Closing Ceremony of the Vancouver Winter Olympics in 2010 as well as at the 2014 Winter Paralympics opening ceremony.

Sources

External links
Maria Guleghina's official website
Profile Page at Mariinsky Theater
Streamopera.com//Maria_Guleghina
Donna. Madonna. Primadonna. Maria Guleghina Christmas interview.

1959 births
Musicians from Odesa
Living people
20th-century Belarusian women singers
Belarusian opera singers
Soviet women opera singers
Ukrainian operatic sopranos
Ukrainian people of Armenian descent
Armenian operatic sopranos
20th-century Armenian women opera singers
UNICEF Goodwill Ambassadors
Belarusian operatic sopranos